Kian Duncan (born 26 May 2000) is an Anguillan international footballer who plays for Binfield and the Anguilla.

Club career
Duncan started his career with Wokingham & Emmbrook, who he represented at youth level. He also played at the FAB Academy in Bisham Abbey, and played for Beaconsfield Town. He also played for Portsmouth at youth level.

By 2018, Duncan was playing for Burnham. He played for Basingstoke Town in 2019, where he made a total of six appearances. He was loaned back to Burnham during 2019, and made the move permanent later in the year. He was made captain in 2020.

In August 2021, Duncan signed for Binfield.

Career statistics

Club

Notes

International

References

2000 births
Living people
Association football midfielders
Anguillan footballers
Anguilla international footballers
English footballers
English people of Anguillan descent
Southern Football League players
Isthmian League players
Wokingham & Emmbrook F.C. players
Portsmouth F.C. players
Beaconsfield Town F.C. players
Basingstoke Town F.C. players
Burnham F.C. players
Binfield F.C. players